The 1957 season was the 52nd season of competitive football in Norway.

Hovedserien 1956/57

Group A

Group B

Championship final
Fredrikstad 6–1 Odd

Landsdelsserien 1956/57

Group Østland/Søndre

Group Østland/Nordre

Group Sørland/Vestland, A1

Group Sørland/Vestland, A2

Group Sørland/Vestland, B

Group Møre

Group Trøndelag

Play-off Sørland/Vestland
 
 
Brann promoted.

Play-off Møre/Trøndelag
 

Molde promoted.

First Division 1956/57

District I
Selbak Promoted 
Sprint/Jeløy 
Hafslund 
Kråkerøy 
Torp 
Tune 
Rakkestad 
Borgen

District II, Group A
Sandaker Play-off 
Jevnaker 
Slemmestad 
Geithus 
Åssiden 
Sørli 
Drafn 
Solberg

District II, Group B
Aurskog Play-off 
Bjørkelangen 
Sagene 
Grue 
Røa 
Grüner 
Galterud 
Sand

District III, Group A (Oplandene)
Fremad Play-off 
Hamarkameratene 
Brumunddal 
Vardal 
Lena 
Mesna 
Gjøvik SK 
Einastrand

District III, Group B (Sør-Østerdal)
Koppang Play-off 
Nybergsund 
Lørdalen 
Ytre Rendal 
Elverum 
Innsats 
Rena

District IV, Group A (Vestfold)
Tønsberg Turn Play-off 
Runar 
Holmestrand 
Tønsbergkam. 
Sem 
Teie

District IV, Group B (Grenland)
Urædd Play-off 
Herkules 
Storm 
Kragerø 
Skiens BK 
Gjerpen 
Brevik 
Borg 
Skotfoss

District IV, Group C (Øvre Telemark)
Ulefoss Play-off 
Drangedal 
Rjukan 
Skade 
Gvarv 
Sportsklubben 31 disqualified

District V, Group A1 (Aust-Agder)
Nedenes Play-off 
Rygene 
Trauma 
Dristug 
Arendals BK 
Dølemo withdrew

District V, Group A2 (Vest-Agder)
Lyngdal Play-off 
Mandalskam. 
Vigør 
Vindbjart 
AIK Lund 
Farsund

District V, Group B1 (Rogaland)
Egersund Promoted 
Buøy 
Varhaug 
Vaulen 
Randaberg 
Ganddal

District V, Group B2 (Rogaland)
Ålgård Promoted 
Haugar 
Kopervik 
Klepp 
Torvastad 
Sauda

District VI, Group A (Bergen)
Sandviken Play-off 
Trane 
Djerv 
Fjellkameratene 
Laksevåg 
Bergens-Sparta 
Viggo

District VI, Group B (Midthordland)
Fana Play-off 
Follese 
Erdal 
Voss 
Ålvik 
Florvåg 
Eidsvåg (Åsane)

District VII, Group A (Sunnmøre)
Spjelkavik Play-off 
Volda 
Herd 
Aksla 
Hovdebygda 
Velled./Ringen 
Sykkylven 
Hareid

District VII, Group B (Romsdal)
Træff Play-off 
Eidsvåg (Romsdal) 
Eide 
Måndalen 
Isfjorden 
Kleive withdrew

District VII, Group C (Nordmøre)
Clausenengen Play-off 
Dahle 
Nordlandet 
Sunndal 
Halsa 
Goma 
Bjørn 
Tingvoll withdrew

District VIII, Group A1 (Sør-Trøndelag)
Flå Play-off 
Melhus 
Støren 
Heimdal 
Leinstrand 
Leik

District VIII, Group A2 (Sør-Trøndelag)
Orkanger Play-off 
Løkken 
Rindal 
Svorkmo 
Meldal 
Orkdal

District VIII, Group B (Trondheim og omegn)
Rosenborg Play-off 
Falken 
National 
Trond 
Tryggkameratene 
Wing 
Nidelv 
Nidar

District VIII, Group C (Fosen)
Opphaug Play-off 
Fevåg 
Uthaug 
Lensvik 
Beian 
Stadsbygd 
Bjugn

District VIII, Group D (Nord-Trøndelag/Namdal)
Verdal Play-off 
Neset 
Namsos 
Malm 
Fram (Skatval) 
Snåsa 
Varden (Meråker) 
Byafossen withdrew

District IX
Bodø/Glimt 
Brønnøysund 
Mo 
Stålkameratene 
Mosjøen 
Grand

Distrixt X (Unofficial)
Harstad 
Mjølner 
Tromsø 
Narvik/Nor 
Finnsnes 
Fløya

Play-off District II
 
 
Sandaker promoted.

Play-off District III
 
 
Fremad promoted.

Play-off District IV

Play-off District V
 
 
Lyngdal promoted.

Championship District V
 
 
Lyngdal - Ålgård not played

Play-off District VI
 
 
Sandviken promoted.

Play-off District VII

Play-off District VIII
Flå - Orkanger ?-?

National Cup

Final

Northern Norwegian Cup

Final

National team

Note: Norway's goals first

Explanation:
 F = Friendly
 WCQ58 = 1958 FIFA World Cup qualifier

  
Seasons in Norwegian football